Svensson is a Swedish fashion retailer, based in Malmö. It has its origins in basement clubs in the late 1990s in Möllevången. Gradually the company has grown to include graphic design and journalism, with the establishment of the Svensson Magazine in 2002. In 2005 the brand name Svensson Jeans was created. In 2010 a second store opened in Malmö.

References

External links 
Website

Clothing companies of Sweden
Companies based in Malmö